The Mark of a Killer (or simply Mark of a Killer) is an American true crime television series currently airing on the Oxygen Network.  The program examines the disturbing behaviors of serial killers. As of Season 3, the series is currently titled Mark of a Serial Killer.

Synopsis 
Each 45 minutes-long episode follows the story of an investigation guided by the killer’s postmortem signature and features first-hand accounts from detectives and prosecutors who worked on the cases, interviews with criminal psychology experts and with family members and friends of the victims or the perpetrators.

The show has regular participants criminal psychologists/experts, like: Katherine Ramsland, Joni E. Johnston and Mark Safarik. Other experts are also appearing in the series for one-one episode like Michael H. Stone or Dayle Hinman.

Episodes

Season 1 (2019)

Season 2 (2020)

Season 3 (2021) 
The tenth episode is longer than the usual (1h 25 min) because it focuses on two separate killers. Also there was a six month break between the fifth and sixth episode.

Season 4 (2022)

References 

True crime television series
Non-fiction works about serial killers
Television series about serial killers
2010s American crime television series
2010s American documentary television series
Documentary television series about crime in the United States
Oxygen (TV channel) original programming